Cadogan is a name of Welsh origin and is a variant of the name Cadwgan. Cadogan is also an anglicisation of the Irish surname Ó Ceadagáin. It may refer to:

People
Cadogan (surname)
Earl Cadogan, a peerage of Great Britain

Places
 Cadogan, Alberta, Canada
 Cadogan Township, Armstrong County, Pennsylvania, United States

Chelsea, London
 Cadogan Hall
 Cadogan Place
 Cadogan Hotel, famous for the arrest of playwright Oscar Wilde
 Cadogan Square

Other
 Cadogen West, a victim in the Sherlock Holmes story "The Adventure of the Bruce-Partington Plans" by Sir Arthur Conan Doyle
 Cadogan Estates, a property company 
 Sir Cadogan, a magical portrait in the Harry Potter series
 Cadogan pot, a style of teapot produced by the Rockingham Pottery
 Cadogan Guides, a series of travel books
 Cadogan Chess, a publisher of chess books, now known as Everyman Chess